The 2007 Asian Canoe Sprint Championships was the 12th Asian Canoe Sprint Championships and took place from September 13–16, 2007 in Hwacheon, South Korea.

Medal summary

Men

Women

Medal table

References

Results
www.canoe.or.jp

Canoe Sprint Championships
Asian Canoe Sprint Championships
Asian Canoeing Championships
International sports competitions hosted by South Korea